KLGN (1390 AM) is a radio station broadcasting a sports format. Licensed to Logan, Utah, United States, the station is currently owned by Sun Valley Radio, Inc.

History
The station went on the air as KBLQ in 1954. On January 1, 1988, the station changed its call sign to the current KLGN.

On October 1, 2018, KLGN changed their format from soft AC (which continues on K277BD via a sister station's HD subchannel) to sports, branded as "106.9 The Fan" (simulcast on translator K295CW 106.9 FM Logan).

Translators
In addition to the main station, KLGN is relayed by a translator on the FM band to widen its broadcast area.

References

External links
FCC History Cards for KLGN

LGN
Radio stations established in 1954
1954 establishments in Utah
Sports radio stations in the United States